The 1880 West Norfolk by-election was contested on 8 March 1880.  The by-election, which occurred in 1880, was fought due to the passing of the incumbent Conservative MP, Sir William Bagge.  It was won by the unopposed Conservative candidate William Tyssen-Amherst.

References

1880 elections in the United Kingdom
1880 in England
19th century in Norfolk
By-elections to the Parliament of the United Kingdom in Norfolk constituencies
Unopposed by-elections to the Parliament of the United Kingdom in English constituencies